Asit Ravindraprasad Vora (born 4 August 1959) was 31st Mayor of Ahmedabad city in India. He is a Bhartiya Janata Party politician from Maninagar. He was a municipal councillor from Maninagar ward. And standing committee chairman in his previous term before becoming Mayor. He also serves as Senior Manager at Ahmedabad's Arvind Mills.

Political career
He was elected for the first time from Maninagar ward as a Municipal Councilor in 1987. Then Jayendra Pandit became the first BJP Mayor in Gujarat. Since he was elected for the first time, he has held various positions in different terms. He was first elected in 1987 when BJP came to power in AMC first time in history and Brahmin Jayendra Pandit became the first BJP Mayor in Gujarat. Vora is Brahmin and after Jayendra Pandit he is the first male Brahmin Mayor of Ahmedabad.
He was also appointed as chairman of Gujarat Subordinate Service Selection Board(GSSSB) on 29 January 2014. He resigned from the post on 8 February 2022.

See also
 Ahmedabad Municipal Corporation
 Bharatiya Janata Party

References

External links
Profile of Asit Vora on AMC

Mayors of Ahmedabad
Living people
Bharatiya Janata Party politicians from Gujarat
1959 births